Wefarm is a peer-to-peer knowledge-sharing social network for smallholder farmers in the developing world. The network enables users to ask and answer questions and share tips about agriculture and business, via SMS or online, enabling farmers in rural areas without internet access to share information. Wefarm claims to be the world's largest farmer-to-farmer network.

History
Wefarm was developed as a project in 2010 by the Cafédirect Producers Foundation (CPF), a British charity that works to support smallholder tea, coffee and cocoa farmers and their producer organizations to build innovative, community-driven projects. 

Wefarm was piloted, tested and developed in 2011 and 2012 as a CPF project with funding from the Nominet Trust. This initial prototype of the system was tested in partnership with smallholder farming organizations in Peru, Kenya and Tanzania.

In 2012 Wefarm won the Knight News Challenge, run by the Knight Foundation, providing support to build a more robust, scalable version of the proof of concept system. In 2014 Wefarm was an overall winner of the Google Impact Challenge, providing funding to launch Wefarm in several different countries around the world and take it to scale.

In October 2018 Wefarm announced it had reached over 1.1 million users across Kenya, Uganda and Peru with plans to expand into the rest of Africa in 2019, beginning with Tanzania.

Technology
The service is free to use and only requires a mobile phone to send and receive SMS messages - technology which is tried-and-tested and widely used by farmers in the developing world. Farmers text questions to a local number; Wefarm uses machine learning algorithms to identify the most appropriate responders, and transmits the message to those users with similar interests in the area, who reply. Although the platform also exists online, over 95 percent of users choose to use it offline. Farmers using the service typically receive three to five local answers to their enquiries within a couple of hours, and often farmers from other countries begin to send advice within 24 hours.

Business model 
In January 2015 Wefarm was launched as a social enterprise subsidiary of CPF, with a for-profit business model in order to achieve long-term financial sustainability and scalability. Wefarm plans to partner with local, national, and international companies who want to increase sustainability and transparency in their supply chains and access isolated farming markets.

See also 
Mobile technology in Africa

References

External links 
 
 'Telephone farmers' reaping the benefits of agri-tech
 2015 challenges: how can technology and innovation be a force for good?

Peer learning
Agricultural education
Internet properties established in 2015
Rural development